Fallujah is an American technical death metal band from San Francisco, California, formed in 2007. Fallujah has toured with acts such as The Black Dahlia Murder, Carnifex, Thy Art Is Murder, Dying Fetus, Between the Buried and Me, and The Contortionist.

History

Formation (2007-2010) 
Fallujah was founded in early 2007 by high school friends Alex Hofmann, Scott Carstairs, Tommy Logan, Dan Wissinger, and Suliman Arghandiwal. The band name comes from the Iraqi city of Fallujah, located in the Al Anbar province. Prior to the band signing to its first record label, early vocalist Suliman Arghandiwal, guitarist Anthony Borges, and bassists Dan Wissinger and Brandon Hoberg exited the band. Replacing Arghandiwal, guitarist Alex Hofmann took up vocals with Rob Maramonte joining the band as the new guitarist. In 2009, the band released their first demo release, immediately followed by their first EP titled Leper Colony released on January 17. On February 5, 2010, the band played their first professional concert in Sacramento, California.

The Harvest Wombs (2011-2013) 
On November 17, 2011, the band went on to release their first full-length album The Harvest Wombs, with producer Sam Pura, under California-based label Unique Leader Records. On April 2, 2013, the band independently released their second EP titled Nomadic, incorporating ambient sequences, clean guitars, and female vocals by former Whirr singer Byanca Munoz.

The Flesh Prevails (2014-2015) 
On July 22, 2014, Fallujah released their second album titled The Flesh Prevails on Unique Leader Records. The album was released while the band participated in the 2014 Summer Slaughter tour alongside Morbid Angel, the Faceless, Dying Fetus, and Thy Art is Murder. The album received significant acclaim, despite some critics saying the production was a victim of the "loudness wars" and had little dynamic range.

On January 15, 2015, Nuclear Blast announced the band's official signing to the label, stating, "Fallujah is all about pushing the envelope, taking risks, and keeping an open mind; with that mentality we felt Nuclear Blast was the most obvious and logical step for a band such as ours. With our team behind us, we can’t wait to see Fallujah grow."

Dreamless (2016-2018) 
On April 29, 2016, the band released their third album titled Dreamless. The album received critical acclaim, and a music video has been released for the song “The Void Alone" featuring guest vocalists Tori Letzler, Mike Semesky, and Katie Thompson, as well as guest guitarist Tymon Krudenier.

On July 14, 2017, Alex Hofmann announced his departure on the band's Facebook page after 10 years in the band, with Monte Barnard as substitute vocalist during the band's 2017 - 2019 live touring for Dreamless.

Undying Light (2019–2021) 
On January 30, 2019, the band revealed longtime friend Anthony Palermo as their new lead vocalist and unveiled their fourth studio album Undying Light, along with the single "Ultraviolet". On November 24, 2020, the band announced that Nico Santora would be joining Fallujah full time. On July 17, 2021, the band re-released The Harvest Wombs on vinyl in a limited edition of 1,000 copies for Record Store Day.

Empyrean (2022-present) 
On April 27, 2022, the band announced that their next album "Empyrean" would be released on September 9 of that year, and released the lead single, "Radiant Ascension." On the same day, they revealed via Instagram that vocalist Antonio Palermo and bassist Rob Morey had been replaced by Kyle Schaeffer and Evan Brewer. They also announced that guitarist Nico Santora had left the group, although no replacement was named.

Members

Current members
 Scott Carstairs – lead guitar, backing vocals (2007–present), rhythm guitar (2013–2014, 2019–2020, 2022–present)
 Andrew Baird – drums (2007–present)
 Kyle Schaefer – lead vocals (2022–present)
 Evan Brewer – bass (2022–present)

Former members
 Dan Wissinger – bass (2007)
 Brandon "Brando" Hoberg – bass (2007–2009)
 Tommy Logan – drums (2007)
 Suliman Arghandiwal – lead vocals (2007–2008)
 Rob Maramonte – rhythm guitar (2008–2009, 2010–2013)
 Anthony Borges – rhythm guitar (2009–2010)
 Alex Hofmann – lead vocals, programming (2007–2017), rhythm guitar (2007–2008)
 Brian James – rhythm guitar (touring 2013–2014, 2014–2019)
 Rob Morey – bass (2009–2022)
 Antonio Palermo – lead vocals, programming (2019–2022)
 Nico Santora – rhythm guitar, backing vocals (2020–2022; touring member 2019–2020)

Touring members
 Chason Westmoreland – drums (2012)
 Alex Lopez – drums (2012)
 Greg Paulson – rhythm guitar (2013)
 Nic Gruhn – rhythm guitar (2013)
 Tori Letzler‎ – clean vocals (2016)
 Monte Barnard – lead vocals (2017–2019)
 Danny Tunker – rhythm guitar (2019)
 Sam Mooradian – rhythm guitar (2022–present)
 Kilian Duarte – bass (2022–present)

Timeline

Discography 

 Studio albums

 EPs

 Demos
 Demo 2009 (2009)
 Demo 2010 (2010)

References

External links
Fallujah at Billboard

 
 
 

2007 establishments in California
American technical death metal musical groups
Musical groups established in 2007
Musical groups from San Francisco
Musical quartets